Mallard Lake may refer to:

 Mallard Lake (Florida)
 Mallard Lake (Aitkin County, Minnesota)
 Mallard Lake (Clearwater County, Minnesota)
 Mallard Lake Landfill, a solid waste landfill in DuPage County, Illinois